The 1979 Bristol City Council election took place on 3 May 1979 to elect members of Bristol City Council in England. This was on the same day as other local elections and the 1979 general election. In contrast to the Conservative landslide in the national election, the Conservatives in Bristol lost 6 seats to Labour, who maintained overall control of the council.

Ward results

Avon

Bedminster

Bishopston

Bishopsworth

Brislington

Cabot

Clifton

District

Durdham

Easton

Eastville

Henbury

Hengrove

Hillfields

Horfield

Knowle

Redland

Somerset

Southmead

Southville

St George East

St George West

St Paul

St Philip & Jacob

Stapleton

Stockwood

Westbury-on-Trym

Windmill Hill

References

1979 English local elections
1979
1970s in Bristol